The Vijay Award for Icon of the Year is given by STAR Vijay as part of its annual Vijay Awards ceremony for Tamil  (Kollywood) films. This category has been retired since 2007.

The list
Here is a list of the award winners and the films for which they won.

See also
 Tamil cinema
 Cinema of India

References

Icon